Qingjiangpu District is one of four urban districts in the prefecture-level city of Huai'an in China's Jiangsu Province. It was established on 8 June 2016. Qingjiangpu includes 12 subdistricts and 7 towns or townships under its jurisdiction. Its seat is in Chengnan Subdistrict.

Name
Qingjiangpu is named for the Qingjiangpu River, a canal dug across Shanyang County in 1415 to more safely connect the Huai and Yellow Rivers. The canal itself was named for the "Clear River"  Qīngjiāng), a name first applied to the Si owing to its greater clarity than the Huai where they met near present-day Hongze Lake and then applied to the Huai itself owing to its greater clarity than the Yellow River, which shifted south into the former course of the Si during the Song.

History

Qingjiangpu District lies on the Jianghuai Plain created from silt deposited by the Huai River. The area was originally held by people considered to be Dongyi ("Eastern Barbarians") by the early Chinese. In 486, during the Zhou's Spring and Autumn Period, the hegemon Fuchai of Wu constructed the Hangou Canal   Hángōu) between Hancheng  Hánchéng) on the Yangtze River in present-day Yangzhou and Mokou  Mòkǒu) on the Huai in order to improve his supply lines during his conflicts with Qi. This early route relied on connecting a series of flood-prone lakes and streams and was gradually improved over time. During the Sui, it became the central course of the Grand Canal. The situation was greatly complicated by the Yellow River's shift south of the Shandong Peninsula during the Song, capturing the lower Si and filling the Huai's lower courses and surrounding lakes with sediment. In 1415, the existing Li Canal  Lǐ yùnhé) was expanded with the Qingjiangpu, a  connecting the Qinghe Docks   Qīnghé mǎtóu) across Shanyang County   Shānyáng xiàn) with Shanyang City   Shānyáng chéng) in present-day Huai'an District. 

At the time of the establishment of the People's Republic of China in 1949, Qingjiang was the most urbanized part of present-day Huai'an. It was separated from Huaiyin County and elevated to the status of a county-level city in January 1951. It was merged back into Huaiyin County in August 1958 and then separated again in October 1964. As part of the elevation of Huaiyin Prefecture to a prefecture-level city in March 1983, Qingjiang City was divided into the separate districts of Qinghe and Qingpu with their border set at the Li Canal. On 8 June 2016, the State Council approved the merger of these two districts as Qingjiangpu and this was enacted on October 8th the same year.

Geography
The district of Qingjiangpu is located in the main urban areas of Huai'an. It is bordered to the east by Huai'an District, to the west and north by the district of Huaiyin, to the south by Hongze District. The ancient Yellow River, Li Canal, Grand Canal and Huai River run through it. The roads, railways and waterways extend in all directions, G2 Beijing–Shanghai Expressway, Nanjing-Huai'an Expressway and Nanjing-Lianyungang Expressway converge here,  the Xinyi–Changxing railway runs through the whole territory. The district is near Huai'an Airport, it is an important regional transportation hub in northern Jiangsu.

Administrative divisions
 Qingjiangpu District is formed from former Qinghe District and former Qingpu District.

4 townships are administrated by the Management Committee of Huai'an Economic and Technological Development Zone
 Bochi Township
 Xuyang Township
 Nanmachang Township
 Zhangma Office or the former Zhangma Township
an area is administrated by the Management Committee of Huai'an Industrial Park
 Ninglianlu Office

Economy
According to preliminary accounting of the statistical authority, the gross domestic product in 2016 was 40,030 million yuan (6,027 million US dollars), up by 8.8 percent over the previous year. Of this total, the value added of the primary industry was 1,025 million yuan (154 million US dollars), up by 1.8 percent, that of the secondary industry was 9,427 million yuan (1,419 million US dollars), up by 10.3 percent and that of the tertiary industry was 29,578 million yuan  (4,453 million US dollars), up by 8.6 percent. The value added of the primary industry accounted for 2.6 percent of the GDP; that of the secondary industry accounted for 23.5 percent; and that of the tertiary industry accounted for 73.9 percent. The per capita GDP in 2016 was 112,624 yuan (16,956 US dollars).

See also
Qing Yan Garden

References

External links
 Official Website

County-level divisions of Jiangsu
Huai'an